Surieyan is a 1992 Indian Tamil-language action film written and directed by Pavithran, and produced by K. T. Kunjumon. The film, starring Sarathkumar and Roja, revolves around IPS officer Surieyan who is forced to flee after being framed for shooting a minister. After reaching a new hamlet he shaves his hair and beard and pretends to have forgotten his past. What really happened to Surieyan and how he will prove his innocence forms the rest of the story.

Surieyan was released on 14 August 1992. The film became the first major success for Sarathkumar as a hero. It won three Cinema Express Awards, and was a trendsetter for further action films in the Tamil film itself.

Plot 
One day, Chettiyar Amma finds a man shivering due to intense cold weather in Top Slip, Pollachi. She immediately rescues him and treats him like her own son. The man's original name in Surieyan, an IPS officer, but he hides his identity and prefers being called as Mottai. Surieyan gets employed as a driver to Usha, the only arrogant daughter of a rich landlord Koopu Konar (Rajan P Dev). Usha ill-treats Surieyan but upon realising his true identity, she feels confused. Surieyan tells his back story.

Surieyan, an IPS officer is employed in Security forces. During an international summit in Bangalore, the home minister of India urges Surieyan to devise a strategy to assassinate the Prime Minister of India promising him a few thousands of dollars in return. Surieyan gets furious and kills the home minister for which he is wanted by the police. Surieyan escapes from them and hides in Top Slip as he previously overheard home minister's conversation to his henchman Micky. Surieyan hides his identity and keeps monitoring the forest to trace the activities of Micky, so that he can prove his innocence.

Usha falls in love seeing Surieyan's dedication to nation. She elopes from her house and marries Surieyan contrary to her father's wishes. Meanwhile, Surieyan finds some suspicious activities in the forest and keeps track of them to gather evidence. Finally he finds out that Micky is under the protection of Koopu Konar and Micky plans to assassinate Prime Minister during his visit to Pollachi. Police trace the whereabouts of Surieyan and arrest him. Micky and Koopu Konar plan to kill Surieyan, so that they are saved. Koopu Konar secretly plants a bomb while visiting Surieyan in prison, but unfortunately, Koopu Konar himself gets killed in the attack. Surieyan escapes from prison and finds out Micky and kills him. In the end, the Prime Minister visits Surieyan and thanks him for his dedication.

Cast 
 Sarathkumar as Surieyan IPS / Mottai
 Roja as Usha
 Goundamani as Panikutti Ramasamy
 Manorama as Chettiyar Amma
 Omakuchi Narasimhan
 Rajan P. Dev as Koopu Konar
 Babu Antony as Micky
 Kitty as CBI officer
 Raju Sundaram in a special appearance
 Prabhu Deva (special appearance in the song "Lalakku Dol Dappi Ma")
 Pasi Narayanan as Ottavai Narayana

Production 
After the success of Vasanthakala Paravai (1991), K. T. Kunjumon again collaborated with the lead actor and director of that film (Sarathkumar and Pavithran) in a new project titled Surieyan. During the scene where the title character shaves his hair, Sarathkumar himself did so because the producers were unable to hire a barber. The film was shot at different locations including Top Slip and places in Rajasthan. S. Shankar and A. Venkatesh worked as associate directors.

Soundtrack 
The soundtrack was composed by Deva, and the lyrics for the songs were written by Vaali. The song "Pathinettu Vayadhu" is based on "Kanda Shasti Kavasam", a Hindu devotional song. The song "Laalaku Dole" belongs to the dappankuthu genre, and follows a  time signature. For the Telugu-dubbed version Mande Suryudu, the lyrics were written by Rajasri.

Release and reception 
Surieyan was released on 14 August 1992. On the same day, Ayyappa Prasad The Indian Express wrote "Sooriyan is a racy entertainer that keeps the viewers attention engaged till the end". On 22 August, K. Vijiyan of New Straits Times praised the director, saying he "succeeds in keeping the viewers in suspense" but criticised the stunt sequences for being unconvincing. C. R. K. of Kalki praised the acting, comedy and cinematography. At the 13th Cinema Express Awards, Goundamani won the Award for Best Comedian, M. Sundaram won for Best Dance Master, and Sarathkumar received an "extraordinary Special Award" for acting in the film.

Legacy 
The film became a blockbuster and established Sarathkumar as a star. Comedy track performed by Goundamani from the film became popular. His dialogue "Arasiyalla Ithellam Satharanampa" became popular.

References

External links 
 

1992 action films
1990s Tamil-language films
1992 films
Films scored by Deva (composer)
Films set in Bangalore
Films shot in Bangalore
Films shot in Pollachi
Films shot in Rajasthan
Indian action films